Dileepa Wickramasinghe is a former British-born Sri Lankan cricketer and a cricket administrator. He was a top-order batsman who represented Sri Lanka, Sri Lanka A and Tamil Union Cricket and Athletic Club in First class and List A cricket. After the retirement from cricket he served as the manager of the Sri Lanka A cricket team and as a selector of the Sri Lanka national cricket team. Born in Hackney, London, he was educated at Mahinda College, Galle, where he started his cricket career. He captained the college cricket team in 1984 and represented Sri Lanka Under-19 cricket team in the same year. His younger brother Duminda Wickramasinghe was also a first class cricketer in Sri Lanka.

References

External links
Dileepa Wickramasinghe at ESPN Cricinfo
Dileepa Wickramasinghe at The Cricketer

1965 births
People from the London Borough of Hackney
English cricketers
Sri Lankan cricketers
Tamil Union Cricket and Athletic Club cricketers
Sportspeople from Galle
Alumni of Mahinda College
British Asian cricketers
British people of Sri Lankan descent
Living people
Sinhalese sportspeople